The 2022 AFC U-23 Asian Cup was the 5th edition of the AFC U-23 Asian Cup (prior to 2021 known as the AFC U-23 Championship), a biennial international age-restricted football championship organised by the Asian Football Confederation (AFC) for the men's under-23 national teams of Asia. The players had to be born on or after 1 January 1999.

The tournament was originally going to be held in Uzbekistan from 6–24 January 2022, but was postponed due to the COVID-19 pandemic, and rescheduled to 1–19 June 2022. A total of 16 teams competed in the tournament.

South Korea were the defending champions, but were eliminated by Japan in the quarter-finals, failing to finish among the top 4 for the first time. Saudi Arabia became the fifth different country to win the tournament, beating hosts Uzbekistan in the final.

Host selection
Originally, it was determined that China would host the tournament, as a preparatory competition ahead of the 2023 AFC Asian Cup. However, they withdrew from hosting the tournament in October 2020 due to scheduling conflicts, stadium completion timelines ahead of other international events and challenges created by the COVID-19 pandemic. On 18 March 2021, the AFC announced that Uzbekistan will host the tournament.

Qualification

Qualification matches were played between 23 October and 2 November 2021.

Qualified teams

Venues

Match officials
The following referees and assistant referees were appointed for the tournament. Video assistant referees will be used in this tournament.

Referees

  Jonathan Barreiro
  Shaun Evans
  Alex King
  Fu Ming
  Ma Ning
  Ali Sabah
  Mohanad Qasim Sarray
  Yusuke Araki
  Jumpei Iida
  Yudai Yamamoto
  Kim Hee-gon
  Kim Woo-sung
  Ahmad Faisal Al-Ali
  Ammar Ashkanani
  Ali Shaban
  Ahmed Al-Kaf
  Abdulla Al-Marri
  Saoud Ali Al-Adba
  Salman Ahmad Falahi
  Mohammed Al-Hoish
  Majed Al Shamrani
  Khalid Al-Turais
  Muhammad Taqi
  Hettikamkanamge Perera
  Hanna Hattab
  Mongkolchai Pechsri
  Sivakorn Pu-udom
  Omar Al-Ali
  Yahya Al-Mulla
  Adel Al-Naqbi
  Aziz Asimov
  Akhrol Riskullaev
  Rustam Lutfullin
  Ilgiz Tantashev

Assistant referees

  Owen Goldrick
  George Lakrindis
  Cao Yi
  Shi Xiang
  Watheq Al-Swaiedi
  Ali Ubaydee
  Isao Nishihashi
  Takumi Takagi
  Jang Jong-pil
  Song Bong-keun
  Abdulhadi Al-Anezi
  Abbas Gholoum
  Abu Bakar Al-Amri
  Rashid Al-Ghaithi
  Yousuf Al-Shamari
  Zahy Al-Shammari
  Khalaf Al-Shammari
  Yasir Al-Sultan
  Palitha Hemathunga
  Ali Ahmad
  Tanate Chuchuen
  Rawut Nakarit
  Sabet Al-Ali
  Ali Al-Nuaimi
  Andrey Tsapenko

Draw
The 16 teams were drawn into four groups of four teams, with seeding based on their performance at the 2020 AFC U-23 Championship. The draw took place at the Milliy Stadium at 12:00 PM, February 17.

Squads

Players born on or after 1 January 1999 are eligible to compete in the tournament. Each team have to register a squad of minimum 18 players and maximum 23 players, a minimum three of whom must be selected as goalkeepers (Regulations Article 26.3).

Group stage
The top two teams of each group advance to the quarter-finals.

Tiebreakers
Teams are ranked according to points (3 points for a win, 1 point for a draw, 0 points for a loss), and if tied on points, the following tiebreaking criteria are applied, in the order given, to determine the rankings (Regulations Article 9.3):
Points in head-to-head matches among tied teams;
Goal difference in head-to-head matches among tied teams;
Goals scored in head-to-head matches among tied teams;
If more than two teams are tied, and after applying all head-to-head criteria above, a subset of teams are still tied, all head-to-head criteria above are reapplied exclusively to this subset of teams;
Goal difference in all group matches;
Goals scored in all group matches;
Penalty shoot-out if only two teams are tied and they met in the last round of the group;
Disciplinary points (yellow card = 1 point, red card as a result of two yellow cards = 3 points, direct red card = 3 points, yellow card followed by direct red card = 4 points);
Drawing of lots.

All times are local, UT (UTC+5).

Group A

Group B

Group C

Group D

Knockout stage
In the knockout stage, extra time and penalty shoot-out were used to decide the winner if necessary (Regulations Articles 10.1 and 10.3).

Bracket

Quarter-finals

Semi-finals

Third place match

Final

Winners

Awards
The following awards were given at the conclusion of the tournament:

Goalscorers

Tournament team rankings

Notes

References

External links
, the-AFC.com
 Competition Regulation (Archived)

2022 AFC U-23 Asian Cup
2022
U-23 Asian Cup
2022 in youth association football
2022 in Uzbekistani sport
June 2022 sports events in Asia
International association football competitions hosted by Uzbekistan